Bhimrao Vishnuji Badade (born August 1, 1947, in Makegaonthai, Kopergaon) is an Indian politician and member of the Bharatiya Janata Party. Badade was a member of the 11th Lok Sabha in 1996 from the Kopargaon constituency assembly constituency in Maharashtra.

References 

People from Ahmednagar district
Bharatiya Janata Party politicians from Maharashtra
Living people
Marathi politicians
Lok Sabha members from Maharashtra
India MPs 1996–1997
1947 births